Esbu Kola (also Romanized as Esbū Kolā, Asbū Kalā, and Asbū Kolā) is a village in Miandorud-e Kuchak Rural District, in the Central District of Sari County, Mazandaran Province, Iran. At the 2006 census, its population was 1,790, in 496 families.

References 

Populated places in Sari County